The 2010/11 FIS Ski Jumping Continental Cup was the 20th in a row (18th official) Continental Cup winter season in ski jumping for men and the 6th for ladies. This was also the 9th summer continental cup season for men and the 3rd for ladies.

Lower competitive circuits this season included the World Cup and Grand Prix.

Men

Summer

Winter

Ladies

Summer

Winter

Men's standings

Summer

Winter

Ladies' standings

Summer

Winter

Europa Cup vs. Continental Cup 
Last two seasons of Europa Cup in 1991/92 and 1992/93 are recognized as first two Continental Cup seasons by International Ski Federation, although Continental Cup under this name officially started first season in 1993/94 season.

References

FIS Ski Jumping Continental Cup
2010 in ski jumping
2011 in ski jumping